is a passenger railway station located in the town of Masaki, Ehime Prefecture, Japan. It is operated by the private transportation company Iyotetsu.

Lines

Layout
The station consists of two opposed side platforms. The station is staffed.  During most of the day, trains arrive every fifteen minutes.

History
The station was opened on February 21, 1901.

Surrounding area
 Masaki Municipal Matsumae Elementary School

See also
 List of railway stations in Japan

References

External links

Iyotetsu Gunchū Line
Railway stations in Ehime Prefecture
Railway stations in Japan opened in 1901
Masaki, Ehime